Muhammad Fareed (() died; 9 July 2011) was a Pakistani Mufti and writer.  He belonged to Zarobi, a village in Swabi District. He was the president and Shaykh al-Hadith of Dar al-Ifta in Darul Uloom Haqqania Akora Khattak. He was known for his Fatwa Faridiya (a collections of Fatwas in 7 volumes).

Maulana Muhammad Fareed died on 9 July 2011, at the District Headquarters Hospital, Swabi, after a long illness. He was buried in his ancestral graveyard in Swabi district. The funeral prayer was attended by a large number of religious scholars including Hamdullah Jan, Sami-ul-Haq, and other scholars, students, social workers, and locals.

Writings

See also
 Hamdullah Jan

References

Bibliography
 - PhD Thesis

People from Swabi District
2011 deaths
Academic staff of Darul Uloom Haqqania
Pakistani religious writers
Pakistani Islamic religious leaders
Pashtun people